Chernevo is a rural locality (a village) in Novoselskoye Rural Settlement, Kovrovsky District, Vladimir Oblast, Russia. The population was 4 as of 2010.

Geography 
Chernevo is located 7 km southwest of Kovrov (the district's administrative centre) by road. Pervomaysky is the nearest rural locality.

References 

Rural localities in Kovrovsky District